James Pope may refer to:
 James Colledge Pope (1826–1885), land proprietor and politician on Prince Edward Island, Canada
 James Pope (educationalist) (1837–1913), New Zealand teacher, school inspector, educationalist, amateur astronomer and writer
 James P. Pope (1884–1966), politician from Idaho
 James Pope (baseball), American baseball player
 J. Rogers Pope (born 1941), school superintendent and politician from Louisiana

See also